Robert Denny may refer to:

Sir Robert Arthur Denny, 5th Baronet (1838–1921), of the Denny baronets
Bob Denny, American software developer
Robert Denny (MP) (died 1419), member of parliament for Cambridgeshire

See also
Denny (surname)